Debby Bogaert (Goes, Netherlands, 1974-07-15) is a Dutch physician who is Professor of Paediatric Infectious Diseases at the University of Edinburgh. Her research considers the physiology and pathophysiology of respiratory infections.

Early life and education 
Debby Bogaert was born in Goes, in the Dutch province Zeeland. There she attended secondary school at Sint Willibrord College. In 1992 she did her VWO exam and went to Utrecht, to do a medical education at Utrecht University. In 1996 she graduated cum laude for her doctoral exam.

For her PhD she was a student at Erasmus University Rotterdam where she worked on the pathogenesis of pneumococcal infections and the molecular epidemiology of bacterial colonisation. Bogaert trained in medicine at Sophia Children's Hospital, part of Erasmus Medical Center. In 2006, she joined Marc Lipsitch as a postdoctoral fellow, where she conducted in vitro and animal studies on the susceptibility of infants to pneumococcal colonisation.

Research and career 
Bogaert was made a physician scientist in the Department of Pediatric Immunology at University Medical Center Utrecht in 2008. She led ecological studies of the upper respiratory tract microbiome and how it related to the pathogenesis of respiratory infections. She was supported by the Dutch Research Council to validate and adapt a metagenomic pipeline. She was one of the first researchers to study the role of the microbiome on the respiratory tract.

During the COVID-19 pandemic, Bogaert herself became a COVID-19 "long-hauler" and interested in the epidemiology of long COVID.

Awards and honours 
 2004 NVK young investigator award (NVK=Nederlandse Vereniging voor Kindergeneeskunde; Pediatric Association of the Netherlands)
 2006 Dutch Academy of Medical Sciences Ter Meulen Award
 2009 Dutch NWO Veni laureate

Selected publications 
  Wikidata: Q108731858 (thesis)

References

External links 
 
 "Meet Debby Bogaert" at ECCMID 2019, Amsterdam.

People from Goes
Women physicians
Academics of the University of Edinburgh
British paediatricians
1974 births
Living people
Erasmus University Rotterdam alumni